Alfred Gray may refer to:

Alfred Gray (Kansas politician) (1830–1880), American politician from Kansas
Alfred Gray (mathematician) (1939–1998), American mathematician
Alfred M. Gray Jr. (born 1928), US Marine Corps general 
Alf Gray (1910–1974), English football half back
Alf Gray (Australian footballer) (1874–1931), played for Essendon

See also
Alf Grey (born 1935), English former football referee